Wero (meaning "to cast a spear"), also known as taki, is a traditional Māori challenge, performed as part of the Māori protocol.  Its purpose is to ensure that visitors come in peace.  It also establishes their steadfastness, and the prowess of the challenging warriors.

References

External links

Māori culture